Girlguiding Ulster is one of the nine regions of Girlguiding UK. Its headquarters are at Lorne House, County Down. In 2006, there were approximately 500 units across Northern Ireland.

In 1974, the Guides' headquarters in Belfast were burned down.

Lorne House and Outdoor Activity Centre Girlguiding Ulster
Lorne is a  estate in County Down with a variety of facilities for Guiding activities, including residential accommodation and campsites.

Lorne House was built in the Scottish Baronial style in 1875 by Henry Campbell, who named it after Lorne, Scotland, hereditary home of Clan Campbell. It was purchased by the Guides in 1946, and was officially opened in 1947

Lorne Estate
Built in 1875, Lorne still retains much of its original character. It was the home of
Henry Campbell, a prominent Belfast linen merchant, who named the estate after
the hereditary home of the Campbell clan in Scotland. Purchased by Girlguiding
Ulster in 1946 it is now an upgraded, modernised residential venue with access
throughout for those with special needs.

Lorne House
The ground floor comprises a large entrance hall, solarium with 
seating area, dining room and 4 meeting rooms.

The upper floors in Lorne can accommodate 29 residential guests in a range of
bedroom sizes. There are 2 bathrooms, each with 2 showers, sinks and toilet
facilities. In addition there is a single en suite shower room servicing 2 bedrooms.

Marion Greeves Centre
The Marion Greeves Centre is a purpose built centre, with accommodation for up to 38 people. It is also known as the Brownie House

Coach House
This former 2 storey stable block has been thoughtfully converted to provide self contained accommodation for 12 people. Offering 6 single and 3 twin ensuite bedrooms, 1 of which has disability access, it is ideal for smaller groups, family celebrations, or an overflow for the main house.

Ranger Cottage
This quaint cottage nestles into the riverbank overlooking woodland. Recently constructed, it can now offer all the benefits of modern living without losing any of its charm.

The first class facilities offer a fully fitted kitchen, a large central living/dining area, shower room and sleeping accommodation for 10 children. Group leaders are accommodated in a twin room with en-suite bathroom.

Conference Centre
The conference centre is a modern space with space to accommodate up to 120 delegates for training events, launches and presentations. There is a small kitchen equipped with a gas hob and oven, fridge, boiler and hot cupboard making this venue a flexible option for a variety of events.

Camping
Lorne Estate offers excellent camping facilities for groups of up to 600 participants. With its river and wooded areas the sites are some of the best in Northern Ireland.

The main camping ground, just a short walk from Lorne House, is a flat area enclosed by trees giving privacy and security. Lorne Lodge provides campers with shelter, an activity room, toilets, hot showers and a BBQ area.

The Glen Road site offers a smaller camping area with all the same first class facilities as the main camping ground. Glen Lodge provides the indoor accommodation with the added benefit of a gally kitchen.

References

External links
Girlguiding Ulster

Lorne Estate

Girlguiding
Organisations based in Northern Ireland